Edmondo Lorenzini (3 September 1937 – 12 August 2020) was an Italian professional footballer who played as a full-back.

Career
He played for Bologna between 1960 and 1964, with whom he won the 1961 Mitropa Cup and the 1964 league title. He also played for Sambenedettese, Brescia, Catanzaro and Sorrento.

References

1937 births
2020 deaths
Italian footballers
A.S. Sambenedettese players
Bologna F.C. 1909 players
Brescia Calcio players
U.S. Catanzaro 1929 players
A.S.D. Sorrento players
Serie A players
Association football fullbacks